Desmarestia herbacea is a species of brown algae found worldwide. Its common names include color changer, Desmarest's flattened weed, and sea sorrel, though the last name can also refer to other species of Desmarestia.

Photos

References

 

Desmarestiales